Sing You Sinners may refer to:
Sing You Sinners (film), starring Bing Crosby, Fred MacMurray, and Donald O'Connor
"Sing, You Sinners" (song), by Sam Coslow and W. Frank Harling,  recorded by Tony Bennett
Sing You Sinners (album), by Erin McKeown